Old Village may refer to:

 Old Village, a historic district in Plymouth, Michigan, United States
Old Village Historic District (Chatham, Massachusetts), listed on the National Register of Historic Places listings in Massachusetts, United States
Old Village Historic District (Monroe, Michigan), listed on the National Register of Historic Places listings in Michigan, United States